Independence is a city in Cuyahoga County, Ohio. It is a suburb of Cleveland. As of the 2010 census, the city population was 7,133.

Independence was originally called Center and was renamed in 1830.

Geography

Much of the land area in Independence is used by the intersection of I-480 and I-77. The I-77/I-480 interchange is a four-level stack interchange, but locals often refer to as the cloverleaf, as it largely replaced a nearby interchange of that type. The larger interchange opened in 1940, but construction of the Willow Freeway, which became I-77, was stalled by World War II and was not completed until the 1950s. In the late 1970s, I-480 connected into I-77. The original 1939 cloverleaf is still in existence on Granger and Brecksville Roads. It is still in use today, generally for local traffic.

In the 1970s, many Cleveland businesses needed backup and extra office space from their downtown Cleveland offices. In the 1970s, the Rockside corridor was developed into offices and numerous hotels to help downtown Cleveland. In 1991, the Crown Center on Rockside Road was built, making it the tallest building between Downtown Cleveland and Akron. This area is referred as Cleveland's Silicon Valley.

Demographics

2010 census

As of the census of 2010, there were 7,133 people, 2,770 households, and 2,054 families living in the city. The racial makeup of the city was 96.6% White, 0.4% African American, 0.1% Native American, 1.9% Asian, 0.2% from other races, and 0.8% from two or more races. Hispanic or Latino people of any race were 1.1% of the population.

There were 2,770 households, of which 30.9% had children under the age of 18 living with them, 61.8% were married couples living together, 8.5% had a female householder with no husband present, 3.9% had a male householder with no wife present, and 25.8% were non-families. 23.3% of all households were made up of individuals, and 13.4% had someone living alone who was 65 years of age or older. The average household size was 2.57 and the average family size was 3.05.

The median age in the city was 47 years. 22.9% of residents were under the age of 18; 6.1% were between the ages of 18 and 24; 17.9% were from 25 to 44; 33.5% were from 45 to 64; and 19.5% were 65 years of age or older. The gender makeup of the city was 48.5% male and 51.5% female.

Of the city's population over the age of 25, 36.0% held a bachelor's degree or higher.

2000 census

As of the census of 2000, there were 7,109 people, 2,673 households, and 2,020 families living in the city. The population density was 741.6 people per square mile (286.2/km2). There were 2,726 housing units at an average density of 284.4 per square mile (109.8/km2). The racial makeup of the city was 97.58% White, 0.58% African American, 1.29% Asian, 0.14% from other races, and 0.41% from two or more races. Hispanic or Latino people of any race were 0.82% of the population.

There were 2,673 households, out of which 30.5% had children under the age of 18 living with them, 65.6% were married couples living together, 7.3% had a female householder with no husband present, and 24.4% were non-families. 21.8% of all households were made up of individuals, and 13.3% had someone living alone who was 65 years of age or older. The average household size was 2.63 and the average family size was 3.10.

In the city, the population was spread out, with 24.1% under the age of 18, 6.0% from 18 to 24, 23.1% from 25 to 44, 25.5% from 45 to 64, and 21.3% who were 65 years of age or older. The median age was 43 years. For every 100 females, there were 90.2 males. For every 100 females age 18 and over, there were 87.6 males.

The median income for a household in the city was $57,733, and the median income for a family was $65,059. Males had a median income of $49,741 versus $34,038 for females. The per capita income for the city was $26,447. About 2.4% of families and 3.6% of the population were below the poverty line, including 2.5% of those under age 18 and 4.2% of those age 65 or over.

Education
The Independence Local School District operates Independence Primary School, Independence Middle School and Independence High School. There is also St. Michael's Catholic School, under the Diocese of Cleveland.  Independence is also home to the Kent State University College of Podiatric Medicine.

Sports
Independence is the home of the Cleveland Cavaliers training facility.

Notable people

 Kathrine Baumann, former actress and designer
 Tom Boerwinkle, National Basketball Association player
 Jessica Eye, mixed martial arts fighter
 Joe Kovacs, puppeteer
 Stipe Miocic, mixed martial arts fighter
 Louis J. O'Marr, 13th Attorney General of Wyoming
 Nadine Secunde, operatic soprano
 Jim Trakas, former member of the Ohio House of Representatives

Surrounding communities

References

External links

 City of Independence, Ohio
 Independence Local School District

Cities in Ohio
Cities in Cuyahoga County, Ohio
Populated places established in 1814
Cleveland metropolitan area